Per amore... per magia... is a  "musicarello"-fantasy film directed by Duccio Tessari.

Plot 
Fantastic Middle Ages. Aladdin is a nice and penniless boy: like his sister Algisa he has no degree of nobility, but he is in love with the daughter of the Grand Duke of Forilarì, the beautiful princess Esmeralda, whom the Viscount of Pallerineri would like to marry, to take over the Duchy.

Aladdin, who for a living is a model in the tailor Jo Babà's atelier, was born on a moonless night and is therefore one of the few who can get to own the magic lamp containing the genie, which is located under a mysterious trap door in the woods of witches.

Even the princess loves Aladdin and this love gives him the strength to overcome any obstacle: the Viscount, the Maghreb magician, the charming Aichesiade, a strange penguin, the interrogation of the four wise men and other obstacles.

Aided only by his five inseparable friends and the genie of the lamp, he manages to make his dream come true, saving his sister from the executioner and giving freedom to the genie of the lamp.

Cast 
 Mina: Aichesiade
 Gianni Morandi: Aladdin 
 Sandra Milo: Algisa 
 Paolo Poli:  Jo Babà
 Rosemarie Dexter: Esmeralda 
 Mischa Auer:  Grand Duke of Forilarì
 Daniele Vargas: Viscount of Pallerineri
 Gianni Musy Glori: Magrebino
 Harold Bradley: Hassan

Release
Per amore... per magia... was first distributed in 1967. It was distributed by C.E.I.A.D. in Italy.

References

Sources

External links

1967 films
Musicarelli
Films directed by Duccio Tessari
French fantasy films
1960s fantasy films
Films scored by Ennio Morricone
Films scored by Luis Bacalov
Films scored by Bruno Zambrini
1967 musical comedy films
1960s Italian films
1960s French films